Robi Levkovich (or Rubi, ; born 31 August 1988) is an Israeli footballer who plays for Hapoel Hadera.

Early life
Gerafi was born in Ramat Gan, Israel, to a family of Ashkenazi Jewish descent.

Club career statistics
 As of 1 June 2022

Honours

Club
 Maccabi Petah Tikva
Liga Leumit: 2012–13

 Maccabi Netanya
 Israeli State Cup: 2013–14 (runner-up)

 Hapoel Be'er Sheva
 Israeli State Cup: 2014–15 (runner-up)
 Israeli Premier League: 2015–16

References

External links

1988 births
Living people
Israeli footballers
Beitar Tel Aviv Bat Yam F.C. players
Hapoel Bnei Lod F.C. players
Hapoel Nir Ramat HaSharon F.C. players
Maccabi Petah Tikva F.C. players
Maccabi Netanya F.C. players
Hapoel Be'er Sheva F.C. players
Hapoel Haifa F.C. players
Hapoel Petah Tikva F.C. players
Hapoel Tel Aviv F.C. players
Budapest Honvéd FC players
Hapoel Hadera F.C. players
Liga Leumit players
Israeli Premier League players
Nemzeti Bajnokság I players
Expatriate footballers in Hungary
Israeli expatriate sportspeople in Hungary
Footballers from Ramat Gan
Israeli people of Hungarian-Jewish descent
Jewish footballers
Israeli Ashkenazi Jews
Association football goalkeepers